The 2012–13 Wright State Raiders men's basketball team represented Wright State University during the 2012–13 NCAA Division I men's basketball season. The Raiders, led by third year head coach Billy Donlon, played their home games at the Nutter Center and were members of the Horizon League. They finished the season 23–13, 10–6 in Horizon League play to finish in a tie for third place. They advanced to the championship game of the Horizon League tournament where they lost to Valparaiso. They were invited to the 2013 College Basketball Invitational where they defeated Tulsa and Richmond to advance to the semifinals where they lost to Santa Clara.

Roster

Schedule

|-
!colspan=9| Regular season

|-
!colspan=9| Regular season

|-
!colspan=9|2013 Horizon League tournament

|-
!colspan=9|2013 College Basketball Invitational

References

Wright State Raiders men's basketball seasons
Wright State
Wright State
Wright
Wright